"I Want to Be Wanted" is a popular song performed by Brenda Lee.

Background
It is an Italian song, Per tutta la vita (For all lifetime),written by Pino Spotti and Alberto Testa. The song was in the original version of Never on Sunday. The English lyrics of "I Want to Be Wanted" were written by Kim Gannon.

Chart performance
"I Want to Be Wanted" was a number-one song in the United States during the year 1960. It topped the Billboard Hot 100 singles chart for the issue dated October 24, 1960, and remained there for one week. This was Brenda Lee's second number-one single, her first being "I'm Sorry". In the UK, the song went to number thirty-one.

Cover versions
Andy Williams released a version as the B-side to his single "Stranger on the Shore". 
The song was covered by Olivia Newton-John on her 1992 album Back to Basics: The Essential Collection 1971–1992.

See also
List of Hot 100 number-one singles of 1960 (U.S.)

References

1960 singles
1962 singles
Songs with lyrics by Kim Gannon
Songs with lyrics by Alberto Testa (lyricist)
Brenda Lee songs
Andy Williams songs
Billboard Hot 100 number-one singles
1960 songs
Decca Records singles